Christos Shelis (born 2 February 2000) is a Cypriot professional footballer who plays as a centre back for Greek Super League club Volos and the Cyprus national team.

Early career 
Shelis was born in Paphos, Cyprus. He joined the Arsenal academy in Greece as a youngster, before moving to London and subsequently joining the youth set-up at Grimsby Town. He was signed to the Shrewsbury Town youth academy towards the end of the 2016–17 season on the recommendation of former Grimsby manager Paul Hurst.

Club career

Shrewsbury Town
Shelis travelled with the Shrewsbury Town first-team squad to a training camp in Portugal, and featured regularly during the 2017–18 pre-season. Whilst still a second year scholar, he signed a two-year professional contract with the club on 3 October 2017, and made his professional debut on the same day against West Bromwich Albion U21s in an EFL Trophy group-stage match. In the same competition on 7 November at home to local rivals Walsall, he made a last-minute error that allowed the opponents to score the only goal of the game. He was supported by captain Mat Sadler in the aftermath.

Halesowen Town
On 21 September 2018, Shelis was loaned for a month to Halesowen Town in the Southern Football League Premier Division Central. He played five total games during his time in Worcestershire, and scored his first career goal from a long-distance run in a 3–0 win over Wolverhampton Wanderers in the Birmingham Senior Cup.

APOEL
Shelis was released by Shrewsbury in May 2019. On 5 June, he signed for APOEL back in his native Cyprus, on a three-year contract.

Levski Sofia
After rescinding his contract with APOEL, Shelis signed a two-year deal with Bulgarian powerhouse Levski Sofia.

Volos
Following a managerial change at Levski Sofia, Shelis rescinded his contract with the Bulgarian club in January 2022. He then joined the Greek side Volos

International career 
Shelis has represented Cyprus at under-17, under-19 and under-21 level. He made his senior debut in a friendly against the Czech Republic on 7 October 2020.

Personal life 
Shelis has two older brothers, Giorgos and Valentinos, who are also footballers.

Career statistics

International

References

External links 

2000 births
Living people
Cypriot footballers
Cyprus youth international footballers
Cyprus under-21 international footballers
Cyprus international footballers
Shrewsbury Town F.C. players
Halesowen Town F.C. players
APOEL FC players
PFC Levski Sofia players
Volos N.F.C. players
English Football League players
Southern Football League players
Cypriot First Division players
First Professional Football League (Bulgaria) players
Super League Greece players
Association football defenders
Expatriate footballers in England
Cypriot expatriate footballers
Cypriot expatriate sportspeople in England
Expatriate footballers in Bulgaria
Cypriot expatriate sportspeople in Bulgaria
Expatriate footballers in Greece
Cypriot expatriate sportspeople in Greece